Kirsten Obel (born 23 January 1967) is a German sport shooter who competed in the 1996 Summer Olympics.

References

1967 births
Living people
German female sport shooters
ISSF rifle shooters
Olympic shooters of Germany
Shooters at the 1996 Summer Olympics
Place of birth missing (living people)